Victor Heinen (11 June 1931 – 21 August 2008) was a Luxembourgian footballer. He played in twelve matches for the Luxembourg national football team from 1957 to 1959.

References

External links
 

1931 births
2008 deaths
Luxembourgian footballers
Luxembourg international footballers
Place of birth missing
Association footballers not categorized by position